Strong Bad's Cool Game for Attractive People is an episodic graphic adventure developed by Telltale Games and based on the Homestar Runner web cartoon, with Strong Bad as the lead character. A total of five episodes were released for Microsoft Windows and WiiWare between August 11, 2008, and December 15, 2008. It was released on the PlayStation 3 in North America on December 21, 2010, and in other regions at a later time. There is also an OS X version.

Gameplay

Strong Bad's Cool Game for Attractive People uses point and click mechanics. The player plays as Strong Bad, one of the most popular characters in the Homestar Runner online Flash animation series, as he goes through his life, interacting with characters. Each game contains a different goal that the player must reach by talking to characters and using items.

Apart from the point and click mechanics, each episode features an arcade-style minigame. For example, the first episode features a top-down boxing game called Snake Boxer 5. Other features include a customizable map, hidden and collectible items such as 3×5 cards used to create Teen Girl Squad comics, and the ability to take pictures to send to friends through WiiConnect24 or by e-mail (depending on the version used).

Episodes
{| class="wikitable" width="100%"
|- style="text-align: center;"
! Episode
! Release date
|-
| colspan="2" bgcolor="#C5F3C6"| 
|- bgcolor="#F2F2F2" align="center"
| Episode 1  "Homestar Ruiner"
| August 11, 2008
|-
| colspan="2" style="border: none; vertical-align: top;"| Strong Bad receives an email suggesting he "beat the snot out of" his long-time rival Homestar Runner. When he gets there, however, he discovers Homestar has entered the Free Country USA Tri-annual Race to the End of the Race, and decides it would be even more fun to beat Homestar at his own game than to simply beat him up. He disguises himself as Homestar, keeps him distracted away from the race, and loses the race. The resulting chaos turns Homestar into a loser, earns him a criminal record, and makes his girlfriend Marzipan break up with him. Though Strong Bad is initially proud of himself for ruining Homestar's life, these efforts backfire when Homestar moves into Strong Bad's house, believing him to be "the only friend I've got". In an attempt to get Homestar out of his house, Strong Bad must undo the harm he did to Homestar's life. Homestar Ruiner also includes a minigame, Snake Boxer 5, a parody of the Atari 2600 game Boxing that sees the player controlling a boxer named Boxer Joe from a top down perspective as he battles round after round of snakes in a boxing ring.
|-
| colspan="2" bgcolor="#DDF3C5"| 
|- bgcolor="#F2F2F2" align="center"
| Episode 2  "Strong Badia the Free"
| September 15, 2008
|-
| colspan="2" style="border: none; vertical-align: top;"| As the episode begins, The King of Town institutes an e-mail tax. Strong Bad is the most heavily affected. However, being unaware of the existence of the tax, he is put under house arrest (with an explosive collar around his neck), a predicament that leads him to unite the citizens to rise up against the authorities. Strong Bad then declares his own plot of land (an empty lot featuring a fence, a spare tire, and a graffiti'd stop sign, which Strong Bad has named "Strong Badia") an independent nation. The inspirational speech he gives to the citizens inspires them to create their own independent countries. In order to overthrow the King of Town, Strong Bad must work his way through the countries and unite Free Country USA once again under the Strong Badian flag. Strong Badia the Free'''s minigame, Math Kickers: Featuring the Algebros, a parody of beat 'em ups such as Double Dragon, involves the player solving math problems by punching enemies. In addition, the game also features a second minigame called Maps & Minions.
|-
| colspan="2" bgcolor="#F3E1C5"| 
|- bgcolor="#F2F2F2" align="center"
| Episode 3  "Baddest of the Bands"
| October 27, 2008
|-
| colspan="2" style="border: none; vertical-align: top;"| As the game opens, Strong Bad's FunMachine (an Atari 2600like video game system) suddenly breaks. Strong Bad does not have the money to get it fixed, however. In an attempt to get money, he organizes a Battle Royale of the Bands, complete with local bands and celebrity guest stars—the 80's hair band Limozeen. When this still does not cover the fee, Strong Bad is forced to compete with his own rock band and claim the cash prize.
|-
| colspan="2" bgcolor="#ECC5F3"| 
|- bgcolor="#F2F2F2" align="center"
| Episode 4  "Dangeresque 3: The Criminal Projective"
| November 17, 2008
|-
| colspan="2" style="border: none; vertical-align: top;"| This episode gets its scenario from an in-joke in the website. The episode is actually the "film" Dangeresque 3. Strong Bad has finally finished his long-awaited film and invites his friends over to his basement for the film's premiere. The player then assumes the role of Dangeresque, embracing the cliches and tropes of the action film genre, with the movie looking like a very low-budget film.
|-
| colspan="2" bgcolor="#C5CDF3"| 
|- bgcolor="#F2F2F2" align="center"
| Episode 5  "8-Bit is Enough"
| December 15, 2008
|-
| colspan="2" style="border: none; vertical-align: top;"| The story begins at the end of episode 4, when Strong Bad jumps off of the couch and hits the Trogdor arcade machine. The Trogdor arcade machine grows an arm, legs and wings and comes to life. Strong Sad claims that Strong Bad damaged the 8-bit containment field and needs to order a replacement. Sadly, through an odd series of events, the containment field is broken, resulting in the world of video games and the world of Free Country USA combining. Video game elements and characters begin invading the real world, and vice versa. In the ensuing chaos, Trogdor escapes his game and "burninates" Strong Badia. Strong Bad must defeat his fiery creation once and for all, by getting party members from other games to advance to the dungeon of the beast and restore balance between the two worlds.
|}

Development

The series was first hinted at in a Homestar Runner short posted on YouTube, called "Strong Bad Gameways", a parody of pre-flight safety demonstrations with the Wii Remote. The game itself was officially announced on April 10, 2008 in a press release from Telltale Games.

According to Mark Darin, lead designer of the series at Telltale Games, both Mike and Matt Chapman, the creators of Homestar Runner, were quite involved in the production process of the games, even early on, "In the design phase, we have brainstorming sessions with them where they contribute to the ideas that will eventually become the plot of the episodes. Then one of our designers will write the episode script and pass that along to the brothers where they review, edit and rewrite whatever feels necessary to make the whole thing feel more "Strong Bad-y."

Reception

 Episode 1  Homestar Ruiner Episode 1  Homestar Ruiner received moderately positive reviews. Aggregating review websites GameRankings and Metacritic gave the Wii version 76.76% and 76/100 and the PC version 73.33% and 73/100. IGN gave the game an 8.1 out of 10, with the authentic presentation, voice work, music and the opening song impressing them the most. They also believed the game to be a must download for fans, but felt that the experience was short-lived and doesn't break any new ground for the genre. In contrast, GameSpot believed the cartoon's humor did not translate well to an adventure game, and gave it a 5/10. ONM gave it 88%, naming it one of the best WiiWare games so far, but that the humour in it isn't for everyone. It was awarded Best Voice Acting for the Wii by IGN in its 2008 video game awards IGN also made it a nominee for Best Story and Best WiiWare Game., this is the only Episode to be rated T.

 Episode 2  Strong Badia the Free Episode 2  Strong Badia the Free received positive reviews. Aggregating review websites GameRankings and Metacritic gave the PC version 80.46% and 81/100 and the Wii version 79.36% and 82/100. IGN, which gave the game 8.2/10, echoed their assessment from their Homestar Ruiner review, noting the game to be slightly longer and more complete than its predecessor, yet still geared very much towards fans. GameSpot, who disliked the first episode, gave Strong Badia the Free a 7.0/10, believing the game was a marked improvement with a more linear and original plot, and funnier jokes they felt did not need to prop up the weak gameplay noted in its predecessor. ONM gave it 86%, saying that although it was longer and funnier, the strategy at the end is weak resulting in a lower score. However, the episode did garner the best reception out of the five.

 Episode 3  Baddest of the Bands Episode 3  Baddest of the Bands received positive reviews. Aggregating review websites GameRankings and Metacritic gave the PC version 79.64% and 79/100 and the Wii version 78.82% and 79/100. IGN gave it 8.4/10, claiming it has "the best puzzles our hero has encountered yet" as well as "the best Strong Bad mini-game so far". WiiWare World gave the game 7 out of 10, commenting that while the series continues to appeal to fans of previous episodes, it does not offer anything for new players.

 Episode 4  Dangeresque 3: The Criminal Projective Episode 4  Dangeresque 3: The Criminal Projective received positive reviews. Aggregating review websites GameRankings and Metacritic gave the PC version 82.68% and 81/100 and the Wii version 81.23% and 81/100. Nintendo Life gave the game 8 out of 10. They called the game 'easily the best episode yet' and hoped the series finale would be even better. IGN gave the game an 8.5/10, again praising Matt Chapman's voice work and the music as well, which they stated was "a little more ambitious than the other episodes."

 Episode 5  8-Bit is Enough Episode 5  8-Bit is Enough received positive reviews. Aggregating review websites GameRankings and Metacritic gave the Wii version 84.62% and 83/100 and the PC version 83.86% and 82/100.

References

External links
 Strong Bad's Cool Game for Attractive People'' at Telltale Games from the Internet Archive

2008 video games
Episodic video games
MacOS games
PlayStation 3 games
PlayStation Network games
Point-and-click adventure games
Telltale Games games
Homestar Runner
Video games developed in the United States
Video games scored by Jared Emerson-Johnson
Video games with cel-shaded animation
Wii games
WiiWare games
Windows games